Darsafeh (also Romanized as Dārşāfeh) is a village in Miyankuh-e Sharqi Rural District, Mamulan District, Pol-e Dokhtar County, Lorestan Province, Iran. At the 2006 census, its population was 59, in 10 families.

References 

Towns and villages in Pol-e Dokhtar County